Lower Huron Metropark is a park in the Huron-Clinton system of metro parks in Metro Detroit.  The park covers  along the Huron River and has hike-bike trails and two self-guided nature trails. In the winter, the park has cross-country skiing. The park also has a water slide amusement facility, the Turtle Cove Family Aquatic Center. There is a 27-site campground, a group campground and canoe camping in the park.

Situated in the flood plain of the Huron River, some parts of the park may flood, especially when Belleville Dam releases excess water.

References

External links
 Huron-Clinton Metroparks

Huron–Clinton Metroparks
Protected areas of Wayne County, Michigan
Huron River (Michigan)